Crnoklište is a village in the municipality of Pirot, Serbia. According to the 2002 census, the village has a population of 338 people.

Jumping plant lice are exclusively phytophagous sap-sucking insects that are commonly found in Crnoklište.

References

Populated places in Pirot District